This is a list of 109 species in Sobarocephala, a genus of flies in the family Clusiidae.

Sobarocephala species

 Sobarocephala affinis (Johnson, 1913) i c g
 Sobarocephala albitarsis Czerny, 1929 c g
 Sobarocephala albiventris Soos, 1962 c g
 Sobarocephala albomaculata Soos, 1965 c g
 Sobarocephala annulata Melander & Argo, 1924 c g
 Sobarocephala anonymos  g
 Sobarocephala apoxys  g
 Sobarocephala atricornis Sabrosky, 1974 i c g b
 Sobarocephala atrifacies Sabrosky, 1974 i c g
 Sobarocephala baculigera Sasakawa g
 Sobarocephala beckeri Hennig, 1956 c g
 Sobarocephala bistrigata Kertesz, 1903 c g
 Sobarocephala bivittata Melander & Argo, 1924 c g
 Sobarocephala boliviana Soos, 1963 c g
 Sobarocephala brasiliensis Soos, 1965 c g
 Sobarocephala columbiensis Soos, 1962 c g
 Sobarocephala cruciger Sabrosky, 1974 i c g b
 Sobarocephala cycla  g
 Sobarocephala discolor Soos, 1964 c g
 Sobarocephala distincta Soos, 1965 c g
 Sobarocephala diversa Soos, 1965 c g
 Sobarocephala diversipes Curran, 1939 c g
 Sobarocephala dives Czerny, 1929 c g
 Sobarocephala dorsata Czerny, 1903 c g
 Sobarocephala doryphoros  g
 Sobarocephala dreisbachi Sabrosky, 1974 i c g
 Sobarocephala dudichi Soos, 1963 c g
 Sobarocephala elegans Czerny, 1929 c g
 Sobarocephala eurystylis Sasakawa g
 Sobarocephala fascipennis Melander, 1924 c g
 Sobarocephala ferruginea Czerny, 1903 c g
 Sobarocephala festiva Czerny, 1929 c g
 Sobarocephala finnilaei Frey, 1918 c g
 Sobarocephala flava Melander & Argo, 1924 i c g b
 Sobarocephala flaviseta (Johnson, 1913) i c g b
 Sobarocephala fumipennis Soos, 1963 c g
 Sobarocephala fuscifacies Sasakawa g
 Sobarocephala geniculata Sasakawa g
 Sobarocephala guianica Curran, 1934 c g
 Sobarocephala hirsutiseta Frey g
 Sobarocephala humeralis Melander & Argo, 1924 c g
 Sobarocephala hypopygialis Melander & Argo, 1924 c g
 Sobarocephala imitans Curran, 1934 c g
 Sobarocephala insolata  g
 Sobarocephala interrupta Sabrosky, 1974 i c g b
 Sobarocephala isla Curran, 1939 c g
 Sobarocephala kapnikos  g
 Sobarocephala lachnosternum Melander & Argo, 1924 i c g b
 Sobarocephala lanei Curran, 1939 c g
 Sobarocephala laticrinis  g
 Sobarocephala latifacies Sabrosky & Steyskal, 1974 i c g b
 Sobarocephala latifrons (Loew, 1860) i c g b
 Sobarocephala latipennis Melander & Argo, 1924 c g
 Sobarocephala latipennoides Soos, 1965 c g
 Sobarocephala liturata Melander & Argo, 1924 c g
 Sobarocephala lumbalis Williston, 1896 c g
 Sobarocephala macalpinei Soos, 1964 c g
 Sobarocephala magna  g
 Sobarocephala medinai Steyskal, 1973 c g
 Sobarocephala megastylis Sasakawa g
 Sobarocephala melanderi Soos, 1965 c g
 Sobarocephala melanopyga Czerny, 1929 c g
 Sobarocephala milangensis Stuckenberg, 1973 c g
 Sobarocephala mitsuii Sasakawa, 1995 c g
 Sobarocephala muesebecki Sabrosky, 1974 i c g
 Sobarocephala myllolabis  g
 Sobarocephala nebulosa  g
 Sobarocephala nepalensis Sasakawa, 1979 c g
 Sobarocephala nigroantennata Soos, 1962 c g
 Sobarocephala nigrofacies Soos, 1962 c g
 Sobarocephala nigrohumeralis Curran, 1928 c g
 Sobarocephala nigronota Melander & Argo, 1924 c g
 Sobarocephala nimbipennis  g
 Sobarocephala orientalis  g
 Sobarocephala paksana  g
 Sobarocephala pallidor Steyskal, 1973 c g
 Sobarocephala panamaensis Soos, 1965 c g
 Sobarocephala pengellyi Lonsdale & Marshall, 2007 c g
 Sobarocephala peruana Soos, 1965 c g
 Sobarocephala picta Hennig, 1938 c g
 Sobarocephala pictipennis Kertesz, 1903 c g
 Sobarocephala plumata Melander & Argo, 1924 c g
 Sobarocephala plumatella Melander & Argo, 1924 c g
 Sobarocephala plumicornis Lamb, 1914 c g
 Sobarocephala pruinosa Soos, 1962 c g
 Sobarocephala quadrimaculata Soos, 1963 i c g b
 Sobarocephala quadrivittata Czerny, 1929 c g
 Sobarocephala recava  g
 Sobarocephala reducta Soos, 1965 c g
 Sobarocephala ruebsaameni Czerny, 1903 c g
 Sobarocephala sabroskyi Soos, 1963 c g
 Sobarocephala secaperas  g
 Sobarocephala setipes Melander & Argo, 1924 i c g b
 Sobarocephala sexvittata Soos, 1964 c g
 Sobarocephala soosi Steyskal, 1973 c g
 Sobarocephala steyskali Soos, 1963 c g
 Sobarocephala strigata Hennig, 1938 c g
 Sobarocephala subfasciata Curran, 1939 c g
 Sobarocephala texensis Sabrosky, 1974 i c g
 Sobarocephala triangula  g
 Sobarocephala uncinata Sueyoshi, 2006 c g
 Sobarocephala valida Williston, 1896 c g
 Sobarocephala variegata Melander & Argo, 1924 c g
 Sobarocephala vittatifrons Hennig, 1938 c g
 Sobarocephala vockerothi Sasakawa, 1993 c g
 Sobarocephala wirthi Lonsdale & Marshall, 2007 c g
 Sobarocephala xanthomelana Melander & Argo, 1924 c g
 Sobarocephala zeugma Hennig, 1938 c g
 Sobarocephala zuluensis Stuckenberg, 1973 c g

Data sources: i = ITIS, c = Catalogue of Life, g = GBIF, b = Bugguide.net

References

Sobarocephala
Articles created by Qbugbot